Amsterdam station may refer to:

Amsterdam Street station, a QLINE station in Detroit, Michigan
Amsterdam station (New York), a train station in Amsterdam, New York
List of railway stations in Amsterdam

See also
Amsterdam (disambiguation)